Abispa ruficornis is a species of wasp in the Vespidae family.

References

Potter wasps
Insects described in 1960